The Jacob and Louise Gabbay Award in Biotechnology and Medicine or Gabbay Award is an annual prize established in 1998 by the Jacob and Louise Gabbay Foundation to recognize outstanding work in the biomedical sciences. The award is administered by the Rosenstiel Basic Medical Sciences Research Center at Brandeis University in Waltham, Massachusetts and is worth $15,000. The winner also receives a medal and delivers a lecture on his or her work. 

The award was created to recognise scientists in academia, medicine or industry as early as possible in their careers whose work had outstanding scientific content and significant practical consequences in the biomedical sciences. Previously known as the Jacob Heskel Gabbay Award, it was renamed in 2016 in honor of Jacob's wife, Louise Gabbay, who was instrumental in founding the award.

Recipients
Source: Brandeis University
 2018: Lorenz Studer
 2017: James J. Collins
 2016: Jeffery W. Kelly
 2015: Stephen Quake
 2014: Feng Zhang, Jennifer Doudna, Emmanuelle Charpentier
 2013: Karl Deisseroth, Gero Miesenböck, Edward Boyden
 2012: Patricia Hunt, Ana M. Soto, Carlos Sonnenschein
 2011: James P. Allison
 2010: Angela Hartley Brodie
 2009: Alan H. Handyside, Ann A. Kiessling, Gianpiero D. Palermo
 2008: Alfred Goldberg
 2007: Mario R. Capecchi (Nobel Prize 2007)
 2006: Alan Davison, Alun Gareth Jones
 2005: Fred R. Kramer, Sanjay Tyagi
 2004: George M. Whitesides
 2003: Roger Brent, Stanley Fields
 2002: William Rastetter, Dennis J. Slamon, Gregory P. Winter
 2001: J. Michael Ramsey
 2000: J. Craig Venter
 1999: David V. Goeddel, Thomas P. Maniatis, William J. Rutter
 1998: Patrick O. Brown, Stephen P. A. Fodor

See also

 List of biomedical science awards
 List of awards named after people

References

Biomedical awards
American awards
Awards established in 1998